Labedera is a genus of moths in the family Lasiocampidae. The genus was erected by Francis Walker in 1855.

Species
Labedera alma (Weymer, 1895)
Labedera angala Schaus, 1924
Labedera angustipennis Schaus, 1906
Labedera argentata
Labedera arpiana Schaus, 1924
Labedera avita Schaus, 1924
Labedera bella (Druce, 1887) Panama
Labedera butleri
Labedera cain Schaus, 1936
Labedera cervina
Labedera cinerascens Walker, 1856
Labedera everildis
Labedera fraternans Schaus, 1936
Labedera fumida Schaus, 1892
Labedera fuscicaudata Schaus, 1913
Labedera gracilis Dognin, 1923
Labedera guthagon Schaus, 1924
Labedera hirta Stoll, 1782
Labedera hirtipes Walker, 1855
Labedera infernalis Schaus, 1890
Labedera jamaicensis Schaus, 1906
Labedera levana
Labedera lusciosa Dognin, 1912
Labedera manoba
Labedera maura Draudt, 1927
Labedera melini Bryk, 1953
Labedera mexicanus (Herrich-Schäffer, [1856]) Mexico
Labedera moderata (Walker, 1855) Brazil
Labedera nigra
Labedera nigrescens Druce, 1906
Labedera nigricolor
Labedera noctilux Walker, 1855
Labedera opalina Walker, 1865
Labedera pallida Dognin, 1923
Labedera plurilinea
Labedera primitiva Walker, 1855
Labedera proxima Burmeister, 1878
Labedera rivulosa Butler, 1878
Labedera romani
Labedera sublucana Draudt, 1927
Labedera synoecura Dyar, 1914
Labedera taruda
Labedera trilinea Dognin, 1901
Labedera vitgreus Dognin, 1901

References

Lasiocampidae